Blair County is a county in the Commonwealth of Pennsylvania. As of the 2020 census, the population was 122,822. Its county seat is Hollidaysburg. The county was created on February 26, 1846, from parts of Huntingdon and Bedford counties.

Blair County comprises the Altoona, PA metropolitan statistical area. It is also part of the Altoona-Huntingdon, PA Combined Statistical Area, which includes Blair and Huntingdon counties.

Geography

Features
Brush Mountain
Logan Valley
Morrison Cove
Tussey Mountain

Adjacent counties
Centre County (north)
Huntingdon County (east)
Bedford County (south)
Cambria County (west)
Clearfield County (northwest)

National protected area
Allegheny Portage Railroad National Historic Site (part)

Major highways

Climate
Blair has a warm-summer humid continental climate (Dfb).

Demographics

As of the census of 2000, there were 127,089 people and 52,159 households within the county.  The population density was 246 people per square mile (95/km2).  There were 55,061 housing units at an average density of 105 per square mile (40/km2).  The racial makeup of the county was 96.18% White, 1.68% Black or African American, 0.11% Native American, 0.56% Asian, 0.02% Pacific Islander, 0.23% from other races, and 1.22% from two or more races.  0.97% of the population were Hispanic or Latino of any race. 40.0% were of German, 12.2% Irish, 10.7% Italian, 9.9% American and 6.0% English ancestry.

There were 52,159 households, out of which 28.4% had children under the age of 18 living with them, 52.60% were married couples living together, 11.20% had a female householder with no husband present, and 32.30% were non-families. 27.80% of all households were made up of individuals, and 13.30% had someone living alone who was 65 years of age or older.  The average household size was 2.43 and the average family size was 2.96.

In the county, the population was spread out, with 21.1% under the age of 18, 3.5% from 18 to 19, 5.9% from 20 to 24, 11.1% from 25 to 34, 19.3% from 35 to 49, 21.4% from 50 to 64, and 17.7% who were 65 years of age or older.  The median age was 40 years. The population was 48.55% male, and 51.45% female.

2020 Census

Law and government

Blair County is a Republican Party stronghold. In only two elections has the Democrat won the vote of the county, and one other election won by the Progressive Party.

|}

County commissioners
Bruce Erb, Chair, Republican
Laura Burke, Vice-chair, Democrat
Amy Webster, Secretary, Republican

Other county offices
Clerk of Courts and Prothonotary, Robin Patton, Republican
Controller, A.C. Stickel, Republican
Coroner, Patricia Ross, Republican
District Attorney, Pete Weeks, Republican
Register of Wills and Recorder of Deeds, Mary Ann Bennis, Republican
Sheriff, James Ott, Republican
Treasurer, James Carothers, Republican

Police agencies

Allegheny Township Police
Altoona City Police
Altoona Area School District Police
Amtrak Police Department
Bellwood Borough Police
Blair County District Attorneys Office 
Blair County Parole & Probation Office
Blair County Sheriff's Office
Blair Township Police
Central Pennsylvania Humane Society Police
Duncansville Borough Police
Freedom Township Police
Greenfield Township Police
Hollidaysburg Borough Police
Logan Township Police
Martinsburg Borough Police
Norfolk Southern Railroad Police
North Woodbury Township Police
Pennsylvania Department of Conservation and Natural Resources
Pennsylvania Fish and Boat Commission
Pennsylvania Game Commission
Pennsylvania State Police
Pennsylvania State University Altoona Police
Roaring Spring Borough Police
Spring Cove School District Police
Tyrone Borough Police
Tyrone Area School District Police
United States Postal Inspection Service
UPMC Altoona Hospital Police
Van Zandt VA Hospital Police
Williamsburg Borough Police

State Senate
 Judy Ward, Republican, Pennsylvania's 30th Senatorial District

State House of Representatives
 Louis C. Schmitt Jr., Republican, Pennsylvania's 79th Representative District
 James Gregory, Republican, Pennsylvania's 80th Representative District

United States House of Representatives
 John Joyce, Republican, Pennsylvania's 13th congressional district

United States Senate
John Fetterman, Democrat
Bob Casey, Democrat

Politics
As of November 1, 2021, there are 77,618 registered voters in Blair County.

 Republican: 47,140 (60.73%)
 Democratic: 20,800 (26.8%)
 Independent: 6,530 (8.41%)
 Third Party: 3,148 (4.06%)

Education

Colleges and universities
Penn State Altoona

Community, junior and technical colleges
 South Hills School of Business and Technology
 YTI Career Institute
 Pennsylvania Highlands Community College

Public school districts
 Altoona Area School District
 Bellwood-Antis School District
 Claysburg-Kimmel School District (also in Bedford County)
 Hollidaysburg Area School District
 Penn Cambria School District (also in Cambria County)
 Spring Cove School District
 Tyrone Area School District (also in Centre and Huntingdon Counties)
 Williamsburg Community School District

Charter schools
 Agora Cyber Charter School
 Central Pennsylvania Digital Learning Foundation Charter School (K-12). Altoona.

Technology school
 Greater Altoona Career and Technology Center - Altoona

Private schools

Alternative Education Program - Hollidaysburg
Holy Trinity Middle School - Altoona 
Holy Trinity Elementary School - Altoona Campus
Holy Trinity Elementary School - Hollidaysburg Campus
Altoona Hospital School of Nursing
Bishop Guilfoyle Catholic High School - Altoona
Blair County Christian School - Duncansville
Champion Life Christian Academy - Altoona
Cove Lane Parochial School - Martinsburg
Crawford Elementary at Adelphoi Village
Emmanuel Baptist Christian School - Claysburg
Faith Tabernacle School - Altoona
Great Commission Schools - Altoona
Harbor House Center Early Academy - Altoona
Heritage Christian School - Martinsburg
Hollidaysburg Catholic School - Hollidaysburg
Living Water Christian Academy - Williamsburg
Northwestern Human Services Autism School
Penn Mont Academy - Hollidaysburg
Penn Mont at Penn State Altoona
Piney Creek Parochial School - New Enterprise
Shady Grove School - Martinsburg
Shady Pond School - Altoona
St John Evangelist School - Altoona
St Matthew School - Tyrone
St Patrick School - Newry
Sylvan Learning Center - Hollidaysburg
Tender Love for Children - Altoona
The Nehemiah Project - Altoona
Training & Development Tech - Hollidaysburg
White Oak School - Tyrone

Data taken from Pennsylvania EdNA - PDE database of public private schools 2012

Libraries
Blair County hosts a system of nine libraries that can be accessed with one library card. Resource sharing exists between the eight libraries. Books from any of the eight system libraries can be placed on hold and delivered to a patron's home library and then returned to any of the eight libraries in the system.

Altoona Area Public Library - Altoona  
Bellwood Antis Public Library - Bellwood  
Blair County Library System - Altoona
Claysburg Area Public Library - Claysburg	 
Hollidaysburg Area Public Library - Hollidaysburg
Martinsburg Community Library - Martinsburg
Roaring Spring Community Library - Roaring Spring
Tyrone-Snyder Twnshp Pub Library - Tyrone
Williamsburg Public Library - Williamsburg

Recreation
There is one Pennsylvania state park in Blair County.
Canoe Creek State Park

Communities

Under Pennsylvania law, there are four types of incorporated municipalities: cities, boroughs, townships, and, in at most two cases, towns. The following cities, boroughs and townships are located in Blair County:

City
Altoona

Boroughs

Bellwood
Duncansville
Hollidaysburg (county seat)
Martinsburg
Newry
Roaring Spring
Tunnelhill (mostly in Cambria County)
Tyrone
Williamsburg

Townships

Allegheny
Antis
Blair
Catharine
Frankstown
Freedom
Greenfield
Huston
Juniata
Logan
North Woodbury
Snyder
Taylor
Tyrone
Woodbury

Census-designated places
Census-designated places are geographical areas designated by the U.S. Census Bureau for the purposes of compiling demographic data. They are unincorporated communities and not actual jurisdictions under Pennsylvania law.

Bald Eagle
Beavertown
Blue Knob
Brooks Mill
Canan Station
Canoe Creek
Carson Valley
Charlottsville
Clappertown
Claysburg
Cotton Town
Cove Forge
Cross Keys
Culp
Curryville
Dumb Hundred
East Altoona
East Freedom
East Sharpsburg
Elberta
Eldorado
Fisherville
Foot of Ten
Fort Fetter
Fostoria
Franklin Forge
Frankstown
 Fredericksburg
 Friesville
 Ganister
 Geeseytown
 Gray
 Grazierville
 Greenwood
 Henrietta
 Homewood at Martinsburg
 Ironville
 Jugtown
 Juniata Gap
 Klahr
 Lakemont
 Larke
 Leamersville
 Linds Crossing
 Loop
 Martinsburg Junction
 McKee
 Mill Run
 Millerstown
 Moores Mill
 Nealmont
 Newburg
 Northwood
 Olivia
 Ore Hill
 Oreminea
 Penn Farms
 Pinecroft
 Point View
 Puzzletown
 Red Hill
 Reese
 Reightown
 Reservoir
 Robeson Extension
 Roots
 Royer
 Shelltown
 Shellytown
 Sickles Corner
 Skelp
 Ski Gap
 Smith Corner
 Spring Drive Mobile Home Park
 Sproul
 St. Clair
 Sunbrook
 Sylvan Hills
 Tipton
 Tyrone Forge
 Vail
 Vicksburg
 Wopsononock
 Yellow Springs

Population ranking
The population ranking of the following table is based on the 2010 census of Blair County.

† county seat

See also
 National Register of Historic Places listings in Blair County, Pennsylvania

References

External links
Blair County Business and Information Directory
Forever Free: Blair County's Civil War
The Blair County Historical Society
Blair County government
Blair County Chamber of Commerce
Catharine Township
Morrisons Cove Herald

 
1846 establishments in Pennsylvania
Counties of Appalachia
Populated places established in 1846